Erika Furlani (born 2 January 1996) is an Italian female high jumper.

Biography
She was born from the Italian former high jumper Marcello Furlani, her coach, and Senegalese mother. She is the sister of the high jumper and long jumper Mattia Furlani.

Achievements

National titles
1 win in the long jump (2017)

See also
 Italian all-time lists - High jump

References

External links
 

1996 births
Living people
Italian female high jumpers
World Athletics Championships athletes for Italy
Athletics competitors of Fiamme Oro
20th-century Italian women
21st-century Italian women